The paddle-tailed darner (Aeshna palmata) is a species of dragonfly in the family Aeshnidae. It is common throughout western Canada and United States. This species is named after its distinctive paddle-shaped appendages. It lives in many habitats, particularly lakes, ponds, and slow streams, usually with dense shore vegetation. Aeshna palmata was scientifically described for the first time in 1856 by Hermann Hagen.

References

External links

Paddle-tailed Darner, ITIS report.

Aeshnidae
Insects described in 1856